Tripp is a surname, and may refer to:
 Alan Tripp, American entrepreneur
 Alker Tripp, Assistant Commissioner of the Metropolitan Police
 Art Tripp, percussionist
 Bartlett Tripp, judge and diplomat
 Billy Tripp, outdoor sculptor and poet
 C. A. Tripp, American psychologist
 Charles B. Tripp, the "armless wonder"
 Charles R. H. Tripp, Middle East expert
 Edward Tripp, author of children's books
 Ella Tripp, British badminton player
 Frances Elizabeth Tripp, British botanist
 Georg Tripp, German soccer player and coach
 Graham Tripp, British cricket player
 Herman T. Tripp, American politician
 Howard Tripp, British Roman Catholic bishop
 Irving Tripp, comics illustrator
 Jack Tripp, British comedian
 John Tripp (poet), Welsh poet and story writer
 John Tripp (ice hockey), ice hockey player
 John P. Tripp, later John Paul Vann
 June Tripp, British actress
 Laverne Tripp, gospel singer, with Blue Ridge Quartet
 Linda Tripp, figure in the Lewinsky scandal
 Madeline Tripp, also known as Madeline Tourtelot, American artist
 Miles Tripp, British novelist
 Paul Tripp, American musician, author and actor
 Peter Tripp, American radio personality
 Peter Tripp, British diplomat
 Ron Tripp, martial arts practitioner
 Ronald Pearson Tripp, British paleontologist
 Ruth Erskine Tripp (1897-1971), American composer, music critic, and WPA administrator
 Sleepy Tripp, midget race car driver
 Valerie Tripp, author of children's books
 Wallace Tripp, American author and children's book illustrator
 William Tripp, designer of the Invicta (sailboat)
 William Tripp (politician), politician, soldier, surveyor, and lawyer
 William H. Tripp Jr, American yacht designer

Fiction
Frank Tripp, character on CSI: Miami

See also
 Tripp of Dordrecht, Dutch merchants
 Trippi (surname)